Percy Romeo Miller (born August 19, 1989), also known by his stage name Romeo (formerly Lil' Romeo), is an American rapper, actor, and television personality. He gained fame as a rapper in the early 2000s after signing with No Limit Records, then owned by his father, Master P. He soon released his debut single "My Baby" in 2001 which peaked at number 3 on the Billboard Hot 100. Later the same year, Miller released his debut album Lil' Romeo, which charted the US Billboard 200 at number six selling 99,000 copies in its first week and went on to be certified Gold.

In 2002, Miller released his second album titled Game Time; it charted on the US Billboard 200 at number thirty-three selling 96,000 copies in its first week. In 2004, Miller released his third album Romeoland; it charted on the US Billboard 200 at number seventy selling just 56,000 copies in its first week. In 2006, Miller released his digital album titled Lottery; it was his first album released under the name Romeo. In 2006, Miller released the soundtrack to his film God's Gift; it was his first explicit album. To date, this album has sold over 300,000 copies.

In 2007, Miller was offered and accepted a scholarship to play basketball for the USC Trojans at the University of Southern California. Miller would play for the team until he was let go before his junior season in 2010.

Aside from music, Miller has also worked as an actor, beginning in 2002, when Nickelodeon offered him his own show, Romeo!. The show ran for three seasons. Miller starred in the feature films Jumping the Broom (2011) and Tyler Perry's Madea's Witness Protection (2012).

Miller founded the record labels Guttar Music, Take a Stand, The Next Generation and his current label No Limit Forever Records.

Early life
Miller was born in New Orleans, Louisiana. He is the son of rapper and entrepreneur Master P and former rapper Sonya C. He is the nephew of rappers C-Murder and Silkk the Shocker, cousin of producer, singer, and rapper Mo B. Dick, and the brother of singer and actress Cymphonique Miller. Romeo was signed to No Limit's subsidiary label Soulja Music Entertainment at the age of 5, after he wrote a rap to his father.

Music career

2001: Lil' Romeo
As Lil' Romeo, his debut album was the self-titled Lil' Romeo. It contains the hit single "My Baby" that charted No. 1 for R&B/Hip-hop Singles. The album peaked at No. 6 on the Billboard 200 and No. 5 on the Top R&B/Hip-Hop Albums. On July 28, 2001, it was certified Gold by the RIAA for selling 500,000 copies in the United States. Also in 2001, he was featured on his uncle Silkk the Shocker's remix single of "That's Kool", which was also featured on his own album.

2002–2003: Game Time
In 2002, a year later after his debut album, Miller put out his second studio album, Game Time. It peaked at No. 33 on the Billboard 200 and No. 10 on the Top R&B/Hip-Hop Albums. It spawned the Billboard-charting single "2-Way" that charted to No. 66 Hot R&B/Hip-Hop Songs. It also spawned a second single "True Love" which charted at No. 16 under the Hot R&B/Hip-Hop Songs.

2004: Romeoland
In 2004, Miller released his third studio album Romeoland via The New No Limit and Koch, it would be Miller's last studio album to feature himself billed as Lil' Romeo; it was not as successful in sales. Romeoland charted at No. 70 on the Billboard 200 and at No. 29 on the Top Rap Albums chart.

2005–2007: Collaborations, name change, Lottery and God's Gift soundtrack
In 2005, Miller, along with his father Master P, founded a new record label titled Guttar Music Entertainment. Also in 2005, Miller, along with his brother Valentino Miller and their three cousins C-Los, Lil' D and Willie J, formed the rap group Rich Boyz. They released their debut album titled Young Ballers: The Hood Been Good to Us via Guttar Music on November 22, 2005. The group later disbanded.

On April 4, 2006, Miller released his debut digital album Lottery via Guttar Music Entertainment, UrbanDigital and GoDigital Music Group, it was Miller's first album released with his official name changed to Romeo. On December 12, 2006, Miller released an album titled God's Gift via Guttar Music, UrbanDigital and GoDigital Music Group, it served as the soundtrack to the same name independent film Miller's father Master P had directed and produced, it was also Miller's first album to be classified as explicit. Both albums contained the song "U Can't Shine Like Me", which was a direct response to fellow rapper/actor Bow Wow, who fans believed dissed Miller and his father Master P in his song "Fresh Azimiz".

In 2007, Miller and his father Master P started a non-explicit record label titled Take A Stand Records. They also formed a new group called Miller Boyz. On September 4, 2007, they would release their debut album titled Hip Hop History via Take A Stand Records, UrbanDigital and GoDigital Music Group.

2008–present: Mixtapes, EPs and collaborations
In 2008, Miller stated he was working on his fourth studio album titled Gumbo Station. On June 17, Miller released the first single from the album "Get Low Wit It", which featured Akon and his brother Valentino Miller, it failed to gain success on the Billboard charts.

On March 3, 2009, Miller released a compilation album titled Get Low that contained singles that were originally supposed to have been on Gumbo Station and also contained original songs from his previous albums. In late 2009, Miller formed a new record label titled The Next Generation Entertainment, the label at the time featured his group the College Boyys.

During this time, Romeo also confirmed that he was still working on his fourth studio album, but had changed the name of the album to The College Boy. Later, Romeo announced that the title of the album would be I Am No Limit. On January 19, 2010, Miller released a promotional single for the album titled "Tell Me a Million Times" featuring Tempo. On January 26, Miller released a second promotional single for the album titled "Ice Cream Man Jr." which was a tribute to his father. On February 16, Miller released his debut mixtape Patience Is A Virtue to promote the album. On March 2, Miller released two EPs to promote the album which were the Famous Girl and Monster/Practice via his label The Next Generation Entertainment and LPD Music. Also in 2010, Miller would introduce his new group the College Boyys; on May 25, 2010, they released their debut album titled Spring Break via his label The Next Generation Entertainment and Hollywood Dream Music, but the group would later disband due to unknown reasons. Miller also on this day released three promotional singles which were "You" that featured his artist at the time D'Anna and Lil Twist, "She Bad" that featured his cousins/artists Lil' D and Black Don and "They Dont Know". Miller also performed at the 2010 Hip Hop Honors along with his brother Valentino Miller, his cousins Lil' D and Black Don, and his uncle Silkk The Shocker, along with Trina, Gucci Mane and Mystikal to honor Master P and No Limit Records. In late 2010, Miller relaunched No Limit Records as No Limit Forever. Romeo also confirmed that he had changed the name of his album from I Am No Limit to Intelligent Hoodlum.

In 2011, Miller toured with his father and Silkk the Shocker. The tour was titled "No Limit Forever International". On January 11, Miller released his EP Dont Push Me via his label The Next Generation Entertainment. On May 3, 2011, Miller released the first official single from Intelligent Hoodlum called "Famous Girl (Remix)" which was the mastered version of the original, it still featured the original appearances from Sean Kingston and Miller's cousin Black Don, but it would be later dubbed as a promotional single. On August 19, 2011, Miller released his I Am No Limit mixtape, which was originally supposed to be his fourth studio album, but Miller decided it would be best to just release it as a mixtape for his fans.

In 2012, Miller formed a new group called Resq3 which consisted of himself, drummer Christian Brock and guitarist/vocalist Myles Eberhardt. They released their first single "The Only One" and were scheduled to be releasing their debut album, touring and filming TV show later that year, but the group would disband due to unknown reasons. The group's other releases consisted of songs such as "Right Along" and "No One Else Like You". On April 12, 2012, Miller released his first single from his upcoming fourth album titled "Hug Me Forever", which featured his brother Valentino. On May 19, 2012, Miller released the music video for "Hug Me Forever". On August 15, 2012, Miller announced that he had been working on a new mixtape titled Inception, it was released on August 19, 2012, under his new stage name Maserati Rome.

In 2013, Miller announced that he was working on a mixtape, When in Rome, slated for release in 2014.
On January 5, 2015, Miller released his first collaboration mixtape titled We All We Got with his group Money Mafia that includes himself, his father, Ace B, Young Junne, Eastwood, Gangsta, Play Beezy, Calliope Popeye, Flight Boy and No Limit Forever in-house producer Blaq N Mild. The mixtape would also include a surprise feature from Lil Wayne on the track "Power". On April 20, Miller released his second collaboration mixtape titled Hustlin with his group Money Mafia. On July 29, 2015, Miller would release two new singles from his upcoming fourth studio album titled "Till the Club Close" featuring fellow No Limit Forever artist Ace B and "Bent" featuring fellow No Limit Forever artists Ace B and Silkk the Shocker. On December 17, Miller revealed the title, cover art and also announced the release date of his planned fourth studio album titled Fighting Monsters, which was set for release in January.

On January 7, 2016, Miller would release Fighting Monsters as a mixtape; it would feature guest appearances from Ace B, BlaqNmilD, DeCarlo, Eastwood, €$¢Ø, JSlugg500, his father Master P, Silkk the Shocker, and Travis Kr8ts. Fighting Monsters was originally supposed to be his fourth studio album, but Miller decided again it would be best to just release it as a mixtape for his fans. On January 13, Miller would release the mixtape for retail on iTunes for charity. On November 1, 2016, Miller released two singles from his planned fourth studio album titled "B, All, In" featuring fellow No Limit Forever artist Young Vee, and "Shoulder" featuring DeCarlo and fellow No Limit Forever artist Ace B. In December 2019, Miller released the album Hidden Treasure, featuring a collaboration with his father, Master P.

Other ventures

Acting career
In 2001, Miller began his acting career with a cameo appearance in the Walt Disney Pictures' film Max Keeble's Big Move. In 2003, he co-starred with Jessica Alba, Mekhi Phifer and Zachary Isaiah Williams in the dance film Honey. In this film, his supporting character was Benny, a young boy looking for a break. In 2003, he voiced himself on an episode of the animated series, Static Shock, to which he had performed the theme song. He starred in another film with Zachary Isaiah Williams, God's Gift, which was released in 2006. He went on to co-star with his father in a film called Uncle P in 2007. His next project in 2007, was a film called ASL in which he starred as himself, alongside Forrest Lipton and Zachary Isaiah Williams who played the young Romeo; Williams had previously co-starred with Romeo in two films and Nickelodeon's Romeo!. Miller also made a cameo appearance in Ned's Declassified School Survival Guide as a rapping coach. He guest-starred as a rapper accused of murder in the 2010 CBS series The Defenders and acted in Jumping the Broom, released in May 2011. In 2011, he also starred in TV commercials for McDonald's and ICDC College. In 2012, Miller starred in Tyler Perry's film "Madea's Witness Protection". He played as Jake, a young man who is trying to get his money back from a ponzi scheme for his father's church and his retirement. In 2012, he participated in Fox's dating game show The Choice. He was a special guest star on the Nick News with Linda Ellerbee episode If Only I Were An Only Child: The Top 10 Annoying Things My Siblings Do which aired on Nickelodeon on May 13, 2013, on which Romeo (among others) talked about annoying things his siblings did, one of which was his brother taking shoes that Romeo was planning to wear, so he could show them to a girl he liked.

From 2013 to 2014, Miller appeared in additional advertisements for ICDC College. He was cast in the 2017 feature film Never Heard, also starring his father, Master P. In February 2022, it was announced Miller had landed a role in the Lifetime movie, Wrath : A Seven Deadly Sins Story, which aired on April 16. In December 2022, he starred in the holiday themed BET+ film, A Miracle Before Christmas.

Fashion designer
On July 24, 2010, Romeo launched his own clothing line titled "College Boyys". The brand has been promoted by Miller, his group the College Boyys, and also artists such as Justin Bieber, Big Time Rush, and Jaden Smith. Romeo stated:

On November 13, 2013, Miller revealed that he was working on a brand new clothing line titled ROME Everything.

Basketball career

Miller played basketball as a point guard for one year at Windward High School before he transferred and became a three-year starter at Beverly Hills High School. As a junior, during the 2005–06 high school season, he averaged 13.9 points and 5.6 assists per game. As a senior, during the 2006–07 high school season, he averaged 8.6 points and 9.0 assists per game.

In the summer of 2006, Miller was invited to the Reebok-sponsored ABCD Camp, a basketball camp in the US. The Teaneck, New Jersey-based camp, an invitation-only basketball showcase, was previously attended by high-profile National Basketball Association (NBA) players including Kobe Bryant, Stephon Marbury, Tracy McGrady, LeBron James, and Carmelo Anthony. Surrounded by future NBA players such as O. J. Mayo, Derrick Rose, and Kevin Love, Miller averaged less than 2 points a game and struggled throughout the camp. Sonny Vaccaro, the longtime director of the ABCD Camp, explained that he invited Miller to the 2006 camp, "primarily as a favor to Percy Miller (Romeo's father Master P), whom he knew from the club basketball circuit." Vaccaro also said, "If you're looking for the profile of an athlete who plays basketball at USC, he's not it."

Despite this, on April 13, 2007, Miller verbally committed to the University of Southern California (USC) and signed a letter of intent on November 19. According to The Wall Street Journal, the decision to grant Miller a full scholarship at USC was largely driven by his relationship with friend and teammate DeMar DeRozan, an All-American forward who was rated as the number five prospect in the country on Scout.com, and his father's influence. The Wall Street Journal reported Coach Tim Floyd as saying, "Last April ... Percy Miller called while driving both players from a tournament in Fayetteville, Ark ... Percy Miller said 'Demar and Romeo are ready to make their decision, and would you like to have them both on scholarship?' ... 'I said absolutely.'"  Miller and DeRozan began playing in the 2008–2009 season.

Miller only played for the Trojans for two seasons, 2008–09 and 2009–10. He only played a total of 19 minutes in 9 games, scoring 5 points and recording 3 rebounds and 1 assist.

Modeling career
On December 27, 2010, Romeo modeled for a new 2011 calendar. On April 10, 2011, Miller modeled for the April issue of TROIX magazine. On April 12, Miller modeled in a new photoshoot.

Dancing with the Stars
After originally withdrawing from season two of Dancing with the Stars due to an injury, Romeo competed in season twelve. He was partnered with professional dancer, Chelsie Hightower. They were eliminated from the show on May 10, 2011, and finished in the Top 5, one week before the semi-final.

In week 7, Donnie Burns was the guest judge and scored the dances.

Other media
On November 21, 2017, Miller competed on the Champs vs. Stars special of the MTV reality series The Challenge. He also hosted MTV's Ex on the Beach for four seasons.

Personal life 
On February 14, 2022, Miller took to Instagram to announce the birth of his first child, a daughter, with girlfriend, Drew Sangster.

Discography

Lil' Romeo (2001)
Game Time (2002)
Romeoland (2004)
Hidden Treasure (2019)

Filmography

Film

Television

Awards and nominations
Billboard Music Awards
2001, Rap Artist of the Year (Winner)
2001, Music Videos: My Baby (Winner)
2002, R&B/Hip-Hop: My Baby (Winner)
Kids Choice Awards
2002, Favorite Male Singer – (Nominated)
2003, Favorite Male Singer – (Nominated)
2004, Favorite Television Actor – Male for: Romeo! (Nominated)
2005, Favorite Television Actor – Male for: Romeo! (Winner)
2006, Favorite Television Actor – Male for: Romeo! (Nominated)
Radio Disney Music Awards
2003, Favorite Male Singer – (Nominated)
Teen Choice Awards
2004, Choice Breakout Movie Star – Male for: Honey (Nominated)
Black Reel Awards
2004, Choice Breakout Movie Star – Male for: Honey (Nominated)
Young Artist Awards
2005, Best Performance in a TV Series (Comedy or Drama) – Leading Young Actor: Romeo! (Nominated)
NAMIC Vision Awards
2005, Best Comedic Performance: Romeo! (Nominated)
Image Awards
2005, Outstanding Performance in a Youth/Children's Program – Series or Special: Romeo! (Nominated)
Golden Raspberry Awards
2013, Worst Screen Ensemble: Madea's Witness Protection (nominated)
Urban Film Festival
2019, Jury Award: I Got the Hook Up 2 (winner)

References

External links

 USC Athletics Player Biography: No. 15 Percy Miller

 

1989 births
Living people
21st-century American male actors
21st-century American male musicians
21st-century American rappers
African-American basketball players
African-American businesspeople
African-American Catholics
African-American fashion designers
African-American male actors
African-American male models
African-American male rappers
African-American models
American child singers
American fashion businesspeople
American fashion designers
American male child actors
American male film actors
American male models
American male rappers
American male television actors
American male voice actors
American men's basketball players
Basketball players from Los Angeles
Basketball players from New Orleans
Beverly Hills High School alumni
Businesspeople from Los Angeles
Businesspeople from Louisiana
Businesspeople from New Orleans
Male actors from Beverly Hills, California
Male actors from California
Male actors from New Orleans
Male models from California
MNRK Music Group artists
Musicians from Beverly Hills, California
No Limit Records artists
Point guards
Rappers from California
Rappers from Los Angeles
Rappers from New Orleans
Southern hip hop musicians
Sportspeople from Beverly Hills, California
The Challenge (TV series) contestants
USC Trojans men's basketball players